Neely Jo Jenkins (born June 21, 1974) is a musician from Omaha, Nebraska best known for being a singer in the band Tilly and the Wall. She was also a member of the band Park Ave. with Tilly and the Wall bandmate Jamie Pressnall, (then Jamie Williams). Previously, Jenkins sang "Contrast and Compare" and "Pull My Hair" with Bright Eyes on the album Letting Off the Happiness, and "Feb. 15th" on A Collection of Songs Written and Recorded 1995-1997.

Album appearances
Bright Eyes - A Collection of Songs Written and Recorded 1995-1997 (1998 · Saddle Creek)
Bright Eyes - Letting off the Happiness (1998 · Saddle Creek)
Park Ave. - When Jamie Went to London...We Broke Up (1999 · Team Love)
Tilly and the Wall - Wild Like Children (2004 · Team Love)
Summerbirds in the Cellar - With the Hands of the Hunter it All Becomes Dead (2005 · Slow January Records)
Tilly and the Wall - Bottoms of Barrels (2006 · Team Love)
Coyote Bones - Gentlemen On The Rocks (2007 · Team Love)
Flowers Forever - Flowers Forever (2008 ·  Team Love)
Son, Ambulance - Someone Else's Déjà Vu (2008, Saddle Creek Records)
Tilly and the Wall - o (2008 ·  Team Love)
Tilly and the Wall - Heavy Mood (2012 ·  Team Love)

See also
Derek Pressnall
Jamie Pressnall
Kianna Alarid
Nick White
Tilly and the Wall

References

External links
Tilly and the Wall official website
Team Love Records
Neely's Yoga website

Living people
Musicians from Omaha, Nebraska
Team Love Records artists
American indie pop musicians
1974 births
Tilly and the Wall members
Park Ave. members
21st-century American singers
21st-century American women singers